Flawed Design is the second studio album by rock supergroup Saint Asonia released on October 25, 2019 via Spinefarm Records.

Background 
Flawed Design is the band's first album in four years and follows their 2015 self-titled album Saint Asonia. The band had brought in Cale Gontier to replace former bass player Corey Lowery, they also brought in drummer Sal Giancarelli, of Staind to replace former drummer Rich Beddoe.

For this effort, the band collaborated with other musicians including Breaking Benjamin's Keith Wallen on "Beast", Godsmack's Sully Erna on lead single "The Hunted", Within Temptation lead singer Sharon den Adel lending her voice on the second track "Sirens", and Starset singer Dustin Bates sharing his writing skills on the song "Ghost".

A deluxe edition of the album was released on December 7, 2019 which includes two bonus tracks, "Say Goodbye" and "Weak & Tired". It was released as exclusives for specific Walmart-purchased copies in the US and as standard built-in tracks for all copies in Europe. On December 13, 2019, Flawed Design was released on vinyl for purchase.

Loudwire named it one of the 50 best rock albums of 2019.

Singles 
The first single from the album, "The Hunted" was released on July 24, 2019. The second single, "Blind" was released on rock radio on March 24, 2020. The third and final single, "Ghost" was released in 2020.

Promotional singles 
The first promotional single from the album, "Beast" was released on September 20, 2019. The final pre-release single, "This August Day", was released on October 18, 2019.

Critical reception 

Simon of Sputnikmusic gave the album a mixed review calling the album a, "solid work" with "ear-pleasing melodies and some decent guitar work." He also compliments Gontier's voice stating, "the glaring draw to this type of music is the voice, and Adam gives a really great performance throughout and, mostly, holds your interest until the end." However, he was critical towards the featured artists on the album. For the song "Sirens", he remarked Sharon Den Adel’s performance, "nothing short of cheesy and unnecessary," and on Sully Erna's performance on "The Hunted", he stated his parts were, "out of place from everything else the song has presented."

Track listing

Personnel
Adapted from the album's liner notes.

Saint Asonia
 Adam Gontier – lead vocals, rhythm guitar
 Mike Mushok – lead guitar
 Cale Gontier – bass guitar, backing vocals 
 Sal Giancarelli – drums

Additional musicians
Sharon den Adel - additional vocals on 'Sirens'
Sully Erna - additional vocals on 'The Hunted'
 Tim Roe - synthesizers, programming
 Brian Sperber - synthesizers, piano, programming

Production
 Brian Sperber – producer, engineer
 Tim Roe – engineer
 Ben Grosse – mixing
 Tom Baker – mastering

Charts

References

2019 albums
Saint Asonia albums
Spinefarm Records albums